Robert Oxenbridge may refer to:

Robert Oxenbridge (died 1574) (1508–1574), MP for Sussex and East Grinstead
Sir Robert Oxenbridge (died 1616), English MP for Hampshire in 1604
Sir Robert Oxenbridge (died 1638) (1595–1638), English MP for Whitchurch and Hampshire - son of above